Lowbank is a locality in South Australia's riverland. It is between the Sturt Highway and the left (south) bank of the Murray River east of Waikerie.

The highway is over  higher elevation than the river level, but only a kilometre away. Lowbank has a slope rather than a cliff. Where there are relatively flat areas on the high ground, they are used for vineyards, however much of Lowbank is natural scrub on the slope. There are several historic landing sites along the river in Lowbank. Lowbank Primary School opened in 1915, but is now closed. The boundaries of Lowbank include the Island Flat shack site.

St Paul's Lutheran Church was built in 1913 and is next to the Sturt Highway.

References

Towns in South Australia